Dana Ulery (born January 2, 1938) is an American computer scientist and pioneer in scientific computing applications.

Career 
Ulery received her BA from Grinnell College in 1959, with a double major in English Literature and Mathematics. She earned her MS and PhD in Computer Science from the University of Delaware, in 1972 and 1975 respectively.

Ulery began her career in 1961 as the first woman engineer at the NASA Jet Propulsion Laboratory (Pasadena, CA), designing and developing algorithms to model NASA’s Deep Space Network capabilities and automating real-time tracking systems for the Ranger and Mariner space missions using a North American Aviation Recomp II, 40-bit word size computer. Over the course of her career, she has held positions as an applied science and technology researcher and manager in industry, academia, and government. In 2007, she retired from her position as Chief Scientist of the Computational and Information Sciences Directorate at the United States Army Research Laboratory (ARL).

In 1976, she accepted visiting faculty appointments at Cairo University in Egypt and the American University in Cairo. On her return to the U.S., she joined the Engineering Services Division of the DuPont Company, where she worked as a computer scientist and technical manager. In the early 1980s, Ulery led initiatives to develop and deploy enterprise application systems to evaluate and control product quality at DuPont sites. For these achievements she was awarded the DuPont Engineering Award for Leadership of Corporate Quality Computer Systems. Ulery also played an active role in establishment of EDI standards, international standards for electronically exchanging technical information used by business and government. She initiated and led multidisciplinary programs at ARL to advance research in multi-source information fusion and situational understanding applied to non-traditional battle environments and homeland defense.

In the 1990s, Ulery served for many years as Pan American Delegate to the United Nations Electronic Data Interchange for Administration, Commerce, and Trade (UN/EDIFACT). She was Chair of the UN/EDIFACT Multimedia Objects Working Group and Chair of the UN/EDIFACT Product Data Working Group, leading early international development of standards for electronic commerce.

Awards 
Ulery was among the first group of female managers at the US Army Research Laboratory. In these positions, she was also appointed Chair of the US Army Materiel Command Knowledge Management Council, and in 2002 was awarded the Army Knowledge Award for Best Transformation Initiative. She is listed in American Men and Women of Science, Who’s Who of American Women, Who’s Who in the East, Who’s Who in the World, and Who’s Who in America. She was named a Lifetime Achiever by Marquis Who's Who in 2017.

Publications

References

External links 
 Works by Dana Ulery in Worldcat libraries
 US Army Research Laboratory
 NASA Jet Propulsion Laboratory 
 Electronic Commerce standards

American women computer scientists
1938 births
Living people
American computer scientists
Quality management
Grinnell College alumni
University of Delaware alumni
Internet pioneers
21st-century American women